Cotton City is a census-designated place in Hidalgo County, New Mexico, United States. Its population was 388 as of the 2010 census. New Mexico State Road 338 passes through the community.

The community was named for its cotton gin, which serves the area's cotton farms.

Geography

Demographics

References

Census-designated places in New Mexico
Census-designated places in Hidalgo County, New Mexico